Penstemon floridus  is a species of flowering plant in the plantain family known by the common names Panamint beardtongue and rose penstemon.

It is native to the lower mountain and plateau areas of the Mojave Desert, within eastern California and southwestern Nevada. It grows in canyons, arroyos, and sagebrush scrub.

Description
The thick leaves are lance-shaped to oval, usually toothed and somewhat wavy, and arranged in pairs with bases clasping the stem.

The glandular inflorescence produces showy flowers up to 3 centimeters long and tubular in shape with a wide throat becoming narrowed at the lipped mouth. The flowers are bright pink with a darker lining inside.

Varieties
There are two varieties of this species. 
 Penstemon floridus var. austinii — Austin's beardtongue, named for Stafford Wallace Austin, collector of plants and husband of writer Mary Hunter Austin.
 Penstemon floridus var. floridus — Panamint beardtongue.

See also

References

External links
 Jepson Manual eFlora (TJM2) treatment for Penstemon floridus
 CalPhotos.
 WHO'S IN A NAME? People Commemorated in Eastern Sierra Plant Names

floridus
Flora of the California desert regions
Flora of Nevada
Natural history of the Mojave Desert
Death Valley National Park
Panamint Range
Endemic flora of the United States
Taxa named by Townshend Stith Brandegee
Flora without expected TNC conservation status